Étienne Pollet (born 30 April 1944) is a Belgian rower. He competed in the men's coxed pair event at the 1960 Summer Olympics.

References

External links
 
 

1944 births
Living people
Belgian male rowers
Olympic rowers of Belgium
Rowers at the 1960 Summer Olympics
Sportspeople from Ostend